Camp Mobile, founded in February 2013, is a mobile application development company based in Seoul, Korea. Ram Lee and Jongmahn Park are the co-CEOs. The company currently operates seven mobile services ranging from social network service to smartwatch application, including BAND, Moot, SNOW, Whoscall, WatchMaster, LINE Deco, and LINE Launcher. 

Camp Mobile is a subsidiary of NAVER Corporation, Korea’s dominant search engine and portal. Camp Mobile has international branch offices in the U.S., Taiwan, and India.

History

In February, 2013, Camp Mobile has spun off from NAVER Corporation with the BAND application, a group social network service initially developed inside NAVER. The main purpose behind the spin off was for NAVER to create a separate, agile unit solely focused on creating mobile applications for the overseas market.

In March, 2013, Camp Mobile launched LINE Launcher, an Android launcher application. In December, 2013, Camp Mobile acquired a Taiwanese mobile startup Gogolook, the developer of mobile caller identification service Whoscall.

In March, 2014, Camp Mobile launched LINE Deco, a phone decorating Android/iOS application.

In May, 2015, Camp Mobile launched WatchMaster, a watchface design platform for Android Wear. In September, 2015, Camp Mobile launched SNOW, a camera app featuring filters and animated stickers.

In November 2017, it was announced that Camp Mobile would be merged back into Naver Corporation in February 2018.

Products
Camp Mobile’s mobile applications are as follows:
 BAND, launched in August, 2012, is a group communication service hugely popular in Korea with over 50 million global downloads (as of September, 2015).
Moot, launched in December, 2017, is a community gaming platform that streamlines the Looking for Group process and allows users to browse gaming news, memes, guides, and more.
 SNOW is a camera app featuring filters and animated stickers with facial recognition capability. SNOW has been ranked number 1 in the camera category on the Appstore in Korea, Vietnam, and the Philippines.
 Whoscall is a mobile spam filter and caller identification service which provides users with information on the caller based on a database populated via the user community's report system. The download number reached 30 million in September, 2015. 
 WatchMaster is a watchface design platform for Android Wear. WatchMaster has been selected as Google Play's Featured app.
 LINE Deco is a phone decorating Android/iOS application offering design icons, wallpapers, and widgets. LINE Deco surpassed the 30 million download mark in October, 2015.
 LINE Launcher is an Android launcher app specialized in decorating the phone. The number of downloads reached 20 million in August, 2015.

References

External links 
 Official Site: Camp Mobile
 Official Site: BAND
 Official Site: Naver Corporation

Android (operating system) software
IOS software
Companies based in Seoul
Companies established in 2013
Internet properties established in 2013
Multilingual websites
Online video game services
Image-sharing websites
Social information processing
Mobile social software
South Korean brands
South Korean social networking websites